Abeer Nehme (born 19 May 1980) is a Lebanese singer and a musicologist. She performs traditional Tarab music, Lebanese traditional music, Rahbani music, and sacred music from the Syriac-Maronite, Syriac-Orthodox, and Byzantine traditions.

Biography
Abeer Nehme has been referred to as "The all styles specialist" because of her talent in performing dialogues between different styles of music, such as: Oriental modal traditional styles, Lebanese styles, Syriac-Aramaic religious ethnic style, Greek Byzantine religious style and Opera and modern western styles.

Abeer is a Qanun player (an oriental traditional instrument) and earned a bachelor's degree with the highest grade ever earned in oriental singing from USEK (Université Saint-Esprit de Kaslik). She was a student of Ms. Aida Chalhoub, director of the oriental music program at USEK. Her renown talent was quickly recognized by the Lebanese, Arab, Greek and Syriac audiences.

As a professional in ethnic old music, Abeer interpreted, amongst other interpretations, a complete album of traditional Orthodox Syriac chants (a dialect of Aramaic) with the Syrian National Philharmonic Orchestra under the patronage of the Syriac Patriarch of Antioch, Moran Mor Ignatios Zakka Iwas II.

As an Oriental modern singer, she played the leading role in various musical plays. Abeer participated as an honored guest amongst major superstars in international festivals throughout the world, and performed as a soloist in several concerts accompanied by various International Philharmonic Orchestras. One of the compositions, "Abirou Salati" (Aroma of my prayer), is a journey through different styles of music; from the old music traditions of the fathers of the church, traditions of prayer and profound spiritualism, to the modernism of the people of God in the twenty-first century, a modernism of grandiosity and majesty.

In 2009, she joined Jean-Marie Riachi for the album Belaaks. The song "Belaaks" (on the Contrary) is a duet with Ramy Ayach and is an oriental jazz arrangement of "Quizás, quizás, quizás" in the Lebanese dialect.

Music
2009: Aroma of My Prayer - Nehme released one CD titled Aroma of My Prayer that represents a panorama of the sacred music from the Syriac Orthodox to the Syriac-Maronite to the Byzantine to the Armenian traditions till the contemporary religious chants of major composers.

2009: Bel Aks - Nehme is the main singer on Jean Marie Riachi's album Bil Aks released in 2009. Her next release is a western music CD in English produced by Darren Michealson (21st Artist Century).

2010: Only The Desert Knows

2018: Abeer Nehme and Marcel Khalife - Sing A Little (غني قليلاً)

2019: Hikaya (حكاية)

2021: Byeb'a Nas

2021: Bala Ma Nhess, a chart topping collaboration with song-writer Nabil Khoury, and music producer Sleiman Damien.

Awards and titles
2000 The award of the Lebanese Diva Wadih Safi, Lebanon
2007 Honor Award from the Apostiliki Diakonia, Greece
2010 the Murex D'Or distinction award.

Theatre
In 2006, Nehme appeared with Fairuz in a play for the Rahbani Brothers at the Baalbeck International Festival. In 2007, Nehme interpreted the leading female role in Andalusia, Jewel of the world, a play by Elias Rahbani produced by the royal family in Qatar and Sheikha Mozah Bint Nasser Al Missned. She is now playing the leading role in Elias Rahbani's play Ila.

Movies
Nehme recorded all the songs of the Al-Bosta movie sound track produced by Fantascope production and directed by Philippe Aractingi.

See also 

 Hanine Y Son Cubano
 Hiba Tawaji

References

External links
 Official Website
 Second Official Website

1980 births
Syriac-language singers
Living people
21st-century Lebanese women singers
Lebanese people of Assyrian descent
Performers of Christian music in Arabic
Lebanese Christians
People from Tannourine